There are at least 161 named cemeteries in Wyoming. This list presents them in alphabetical order by county.

Wyoming  is a state in the mountain region of the Western United States.  Wyoming is the 10th most extensive, but the least populous and the 2nd least densely populated of the 50 United States.  The western two thirds of the state is covered mostly with the mountain ranges and rangelands in the foothills of the Eastern Rocky Mountains, while the eastern third of the state is high elevation prairie known as the High Plains.

Albany County
 Green Hill Cemetery, el.

Big Horn County
 Basin Cemetery, el. 
 Bonanza Cemetery, el. 
 Burlington Cemetery, el. 
 Byron Cemetery, el. 
 Cowley Cemetery, el. 
 Deaver Cemetery, el. 
 Emblem Cemetery, el. 
 Greybull Cemetery, el. 
 Hyattville Cemetery, el. 
 Kane Cemetery, el. 
 Lovell Cemetery, el. 
 Manderson Cemetery, el. 
 Penrose Cemetery, el. 
 Shell Cemetery, el. 
 Whaley Cemetery, el.

Campbell County

 Kintz Cemetery, el. 
 Mount Pisgah Cemetery, el. 
 Pleasant Valley Cemetery, el.

Carbon County
 Baggs Cemetery, el. 
 Baker Cemetery, el. 
 Battle Cemetery, el. 
 Carbon Cemetery, 
 Dunkard Cemetery, el. 
 Elk Mountain Cemetery, el. 
 Encampment Cemetery, el. 
 Eversole Cemetery, el. 
 Pioneer Cemetery, el. 
 Platt Cemetery, el. 
 Rawlins Cemetery, el. 
 Reader Cemetery, el.

Converse County
 Douglas Cemetery, el. 
 Fort Fetterman Cemetery, el. 
 Grant Cemetery, el. 
 H A Unthank Grave, el.

Crook County
 Green Mountain Cemetery, el. 
 Greenwood Cemetery, el. 
 Hulett Cemetery, el. 
 Inyan Kara Cemetery, el. 
 Miller Creek Cemetery, el. 
 Moore Hill Cemetery, el. 
 Mount Moriah Cemetery, el. 
 New Haven Cemetery, el.

Fremont County
 Aragon Cemetery, el. 
 Arapahoe Catholic Cemetery, el. 
 Arapahoe Cemetery, el. 
 Burnaugh Cemetery, el. 
 Chavez Cemetery, el. 
 Collins Cemetery, el. 
 Dubois Cemetery, el. 
 Friday Cemetery, el. 
 Grave of N B Kinnear, el. 
 Hurtado Cemetery, el. 
 Indian Cemetery, el. 
 Lake View Cemetery, el. 
 Le Clair Cemetery, el. 
 Little Popo Agie Cemetery, el. 
 Lost Cabin Cemetery, el. 
 Mount Hope Cemetery, el. 
 Mountain View Cemetery, el. 
 Odd Fellows Cemetery, el. 
 Red Man Cemetery, el. 
 Saint Michael Cemetery, el. 
 Shakespare Cemetery, el. 
 Wallowing Bull Cemetery, el. 
 White Plume Cemetery, el. 
 Willow Cemetery, el. 
 Yellow Calf Cemetery, el.

Goshen County
 La Grange Cemetery, el. 
 Lingle Cemetery, el. 
 Prairie Center Cemetery, el. 
 Red Cloud Cemetery, el. 
 Valley View Cemetery, el. 
 Valley View Cemetery, el.

Hot Springs County
 Monument Hill Cemetery, el. 
 Riverside Cemetery, el.

Johnson County
 Kaycee Cemetery, el. 
 Little Piney Cemetery, el. 
 Morgareidge Cemetery, el. 
 Willow Grove Cemetery, el.

Laramie County
 Albin Cemetery, el. 
 Beth El Cemetery, Wyoming, el. 
 Burns Cemetery, el. 
 Cheyenne Memorial Gardens, el. 
 Cheyenne National Cemetery
 Lakeview Cemetery, Wyoming, el. 
 Lindbergh Cemetery, el. 
 Little Bear Cemetery, el. 
 Olivet Cemetery, el.

Lincoln County
 Afton Cemetery, el. 
 Auburn Cemetery, el. 
 Ball Cemetery, el. 
 Bedford Cemetery, el. 
 Cokeville Cemetery, el. 
 Cumberland Cemetery, el. 
 Elizabeth Paul Grave, el. 
 Estella Brown Grave, el. 
 Etna Cemetery, el. 
 Fairview Cemetery, el. 
 Grover Cemetery, el. 
 Hamstork Cemetery, el. 
 Holden Cemetery, el. 
 Nancy Hill Grave, el. 
 Smoot Cemetery, el. 
 Thayne Cemetery, el.

Natrona County
 Freeland Cemetery, el. 
 Highland Cemetery, Wyoming, el. 
 Midwest Cemetery, el. 
 Natrona Memorial Gardens, el.

Niobrara County
 Dellview Cemetery, el. 
 Jireh Cemetery, el. 
 Lusk Cemetery, el. 
 Mother Featherlegs Cemetery, el. 
 Pleasant Ridge Pioneer Cemetery, el. 
 Prairie View Cemetery, el. 
 Reynolds Cemetery, el.

Park County
 Clark Cemetery, el. 
 Crown Hill Cemetery, Wyoming, el. 
 Riverside Cemetery, el.

Platte County
 Dwyer Cemetery, el. 
 Horseshoe Cemetery, el. 
 Lucindy Rollins Grave, el. 
 Wheatland Cemetery, el.

Sheridan County
 Arvada Cemetery, el. 
 Big Horn Cemetery, el. 
 Monarch Cemetery, el. 
 Mount Hope Cemetery, el.

Sublette County
 Bondurant Cemetery, el. 
 Boulder Cemetery, el. 
 Cottonwood Cemetery, el. 
 Indian Graves, el. 
 Mount Olivet Cemetery, el. 
 Plainview Cemetery, el. 
 Plainview Cemetery, el. 
 Tie Camp Cemetery, el. 
 Vible Cemetery, el. 
 Wilhelm Cemetery, el.

Sweetwater County
 Anderson Cemetery, el. 
 Burntfork Cemetery, el. 
 Eden Valley Cemetery, el. 
 McKinnon Cemetery, el. 
 McKinnon Cemetery, el. 
 Mountain View Cemetery, el. 
 Riverview Cemetery, el. 
 Whitman Cemetery, el. 
 Widdop Cemetery, el.

Teton County
 Aspen Hill Cemetery, el. 
 Elliott Cemetery, el.

Uinta County
 Almy Cemetery, el. 
 City Cemetery, el. 
 Evanston Cemetery, el. 
 Fort Bridger Cemetery, el. 
 Johnson Cemetery, el. 
 Lonetree Cemetery, el. 
 Millburne Cemetery, el. 
 Spring Valley Cemetery, el.

Washakie County
 Riverview Memorial Gardens, el.

Weston County
 Boyd Cemetery, el. 
 Cambria Cemetery, el. 
 Green Mountain Cemetery, el. 
 Greenwood Cemetery, el. 
 Greenwood Cemetery, el.

Notes

Cemeteries in Wyoming
Wyoming